Lushootseed (txʷəlšucid, dxʷləšucid), also Puget Salish, Puget Sound Salish or Skagit-Nisqually, is a language made up of a dialect continuum of several Salish tribes of modern-day Washington state.  Lushootseed is one of the Coast Salish languages, one of two main divisions of the Salishan language family.

Its pre-contact range extended from around modern-day Olympia, Washington to Bellingham, Washington, spoken by roughly 12 thousand at its peak. The dialects of the language can be split into two categories: northern and southern, which can further be split into dialects spoken by the individual peoples who spoke it. Today, it is mostly used in heritage and symbolic purposes, like on signage or place names. It is seldom spoken today, and is classified as Critically Endangered by the UNESCO Atlas of the World’s Languages in Danger.

Phonology
Lushootseed has a complex consonantal phonology and 4 vowel phonemes. Along with more common voicing and labialization contrasts, Lushootseed has a plain-glottalic contrast, which is realized as laryngealized with sonorants, ejective with voiceless stops or fricatives.

Consonants

Lushootseed has no phonemic nasals.

Vowels

Syntax 
Lushootseed can be considered a relatively agglutinating language, given its high number of morphemes, including a large number of lexical suffixes. Word order is fairly flexible, although it is generally considered to be verb-subject-object (VSO).

Lushootseed is capable of creating grammatically correct sentences that contain only a verb, with no subject or object. All information beyond the action is to be understood by context. This can be demonstrated in ʔuʔəy’dub [someone] managed to find [someone/something]'. Sentences which contain no verb at all are also common, as Lushootseed has no copula. An example of such a sentence is stab əẃə tiʔiɫ 'What [is] that?'.

Despite its general status as VSO, Lushootseed can be rearranged to be subject-verb-object (SVO) and verb-object-subject (VOS). Doing so does not modify the words themselves, but requires the particle ʔə to mark the change. The exact nature of this particle is the subject of some debate.

Prepositions in Lushootseed are almost entirely handled by one word, ʔal, which can mean ‘on, above, in, beside, around’ among a number of potential other meanings. They come before the object they reference, much like in English. Examples of this can be found in the following sentences:

 stab əẃə tiʔiɫ ʔal tə stuləkʷ ‘What is that in the river?’
 ʔuyayus ti dbad ʔal tudiʔ ‘My Father is working over there.’
 šəqabac ʔal ti piit ‘On top of the bed'''.’ (this example is interesting as šəqabac actually means ‘on top of a large/bulky object’ on its own, but still contains the ʔal preposition)

Determiners usually come before a noun they belong to, and have two possible genders “masculine” and “feminine”. However, in a sentence reordered to become SVO, such as sqwəbayʔ ti ʔučalatəb ʔə tiʔiɬ wiw'su ‘The dog is what the children chased’ the determiner for sqwəbayʔ ‘dog’ comes after the noun, instead of before it. Gender primarily manifests in the addition of an -s- within the determiner, generally following immediately after the first letter of the word, i.e. tiʔiɫ ‘that’ becomes tsiʔiɫ, te ‘the, a’ becomes tse, ti ‘this’ becomes tsi.

Lushootseed has four subject pronouns: čəd ‘I’ (first-person singular), čəɫ ‘we’ (first-person plural), čəxʷ ‘you’ (second-person singular), and čələp ‘you’ (second-person plural). It does not generally refer to the third person in any way. The subject pronoun always comes in the second position in the sentence. For example dxʷləbiʔ čəxʷ ʔu ‘Are you Lummi?’ as compared to xʷiʔ čəd lədxʷləbiʔ ‘I am not Lummi’. Here, negation takes the first position, the subject pronoun takes the second, and Lummi is pushed to the end of the sentence.

Negation in Lushootseed takes the form of an adverb xʷiʔ 'no, none, nothing' which always comes at the beginning of the sentence that is to be negated. It is constructed in two possible ways, one for negatives of existence, and one for negatives of identity. If taking the form of a negative of identity, a proclitic lə- must be added to the sentence on the next adverb. If there are no further adverbs in the sentence, the proclitic attaches to the head word of the predicate, as in the sentence xʷiʔ čəxʷ sixʷ ləbakʷ  Don't get hurt again.'

Related languages and current status

Lushootseed, like its neighbour Twana, is in the Central Coast Salish subgroup of the Salishan family of languages. The language was spoken by many Puget Sound region peoples, including the Duwamish, Steilacoom, Suquamish, Squaxin Island Tribe, Muckleshoot, Snoqualmie, Nisqually, and Puyallup in the south and the Snohomish, Stillaguamish, Skagit, and Swinomish in the north.

Ethnologue quotes a source published in 1990 (and therefore presumably reflecting the situation in the late 1980s), according to which there were 60 fluent speakers of Lushootseed, evenly divided between the northern and southern dialects. On the other hand, the Ethnologue list of United States languages also lists, alongside Lushootseed's 60 speakers, 100 speakers for Skagit, 107 for Southern Puget Sound Salish, and 10 for Snohomish (a dialect on the boundary between the northern and southern varieties). Some sources given for these figures, however, go back to the 1970s when the language was less critically endangered. Linguist Marianne Mithun has collected more recent data on the number of speakers of various Native American languages, and could document that by the end of the 1990s there were only a handful of elders left who spoke Lushootseed fluently. The language was extensively documented and studied by linguists with the aid of tribal elder Vi Hilbert, d. 2008, who was the last speaker with a full native command of Lushootseed. There are efforts at reviving the language, and instructional materials have been published.

 Language revitalization 
, the Tulalip Tribes' Lushootseed Language Department teaches classes in Lushootseed, and its website offers a Lushootseed "phrase of the week" with audio. The Tulalip Montessori School also teaches Lushootseed to young children.

Wa He Lut Indian School teaches Lushootseed to Native elementary school children in their Native Language and Culture program. 

, an annual Lushootseed conference is held at Seattle University. A course in Lushootseed language and literature has been offered at Evergreen State College.
Lushootseed has also been used as a part of environmental history courses at Pacific Lutheran University. It has been spoken during the annual Tribal Canoe Journey (Tribal Journeys) that take place throughout the Salish Sea.

There are also efforts within the Puyallup Tribe. Their website and social media, aimed at anyone interested in learning the language, are updated often.

To facilitate the use of Lushootseed in electronic files, in 2008 the tribe contracted type designer Juliet Shen to create Unicode-compliant typefaces that met the needs of the language. Drawing upon traditional Lushootseed carvings and artwork, she developed two typefaces: Lushootseed School and Lushootseed Sulad.

In the summer of 2016, the first ever adult immersion program in Lushootseed was offered at the University of Washington's Tacoma campus. It was sponsored by The Puyallup Tribal Language Program in partnership with University of Washington Tacoma and its School of Interdisciplinary Arts and Sciences. A similar program is scheduled to be offered in August 2019, with the instructors Danica Sterud Miller, Assistant Professor of American Indian Studies at the University of Washington Tacoma, and Zalmai Zahir, a PhD student of theoretical linguistics at the University of Oregon.

Subdivisions
Lushootseed consists of two dialect groups which can be further divided into subdialects:

Skagit, Skaǰət-Swinomish or Lower Skagit-Swinomish dialects
 Lower Skagit (Whidbey Island Skagit) (on Skagit River and on Whidbey Island, subdialect of Skaǰət-Swinomish)
 Upper Skagit (along upper Skagit River, subdialect of Skaǰət-Swinomish)
 Swinomish (at the mouth of Skagit Rivers and northern part of Whidbey Island, sometimes considered a Lower Skagit band, subdialect of Skaǰət-Swinomish)
 Kikiallus (Ki Ki Allus or  Kikyalus) (between Lower Skagit and Swinomish lands, sometimes considered a Lower Skagit band, Kikiallus subdialect of Skaǰət-Swinomish)
 Sauk-Suiattle (Sah-Ku-Me-Hu) (on Sauk River and Suiattle River,  or Sauk-Suiattle dialect)
 Southern Lushootseed or Whulshootseed / Twulshootseed (Southern Puget Sound Salish)' 
 Skykomish (Skai-whamish) (originally considered a subdivision of the Snoqualmies, 
 Steilacoom
 Suquamish
 Duwamish
 Muckleshoot (bǝqǝlšuɫucid) (on Green and White rivers)
 Nisqually ( or )
 Sahewamish
 Snohomish (Sdoh-doh-hohbsh) (around the Puget Sound area of Washington, north of Seattle)
 Squaxin Island Tribe

Alphabet
According to work published by Vi Hilbert and other Lushootseed language specialists, Lushootseed uses a morphophonemic writing system meaning that it is a phonemic alphabet which does not change to reflect the pronunciation such as when an affix is introduced. The chart below is based on the Lushootseed Dictionary. Typographic variations such as p' and p̓ do not indicate phonemic distinctions.

See the external links below for resources.

Some vocabulary

The Lushootseed language originates from the coastal region of Northwest Washington State and the Southwest coast of Canada. There are words in the Lushootseed language which are related to the environment and the fishing economy that surrounded the Salish tribes. The following tables show different words from different Lushootseed dialects relating to the salmon fishing and coastal economies.

References

 Language learning materials 
 Bates, D., Hess, T., & Hilbert, V. (1994). Lushootseed dictionary. Seattle: University of Washington Press. 
 Beck, David. "Transitivity and causation in Lushootseed morphology." Working Papers of the Linguistics Circle 13 (1996): 11–20.
 

 Chamberlain, Rebecca, Lushootseed Language & Literature: Program reader. (Lushootseed language, cultural, and storytelling traditions.)

 Hess, Thom and Vi Hilbert. Lushootseed Book 1; The language of the Skagit, Nisqually, and other tribes of Puget Sound. An Introduction. Lushootseed Press 1995
 Hess, Thom and Vi Hilbert. Lushootseed Book 2 (Advanced Lushootseed). Lushootseed Press, 1995

 Hilbert, Vi. Haboo: Native American Stories from Puget Sound. Seattle: University of Washington, 1985
 Hilbert, Vi, Crisca Bierwest, Thom Hess. Way of the Lushootseed People; Ceremonies & Traditions of North Puget Sound's First People. Third Edition, Lushootseed Press, 2001
 dxʷlešucid xʷgʷədgʷatəd tul̓ʔal taqʷšəblu; Some Lushootseed Vocabulary from taqʷšəblu''. Lushootseed Press, 1993

External links

 Puyallup Tribal Language Program
 The Tulalip Lushootseed Department's Website
 Keyboards and fonts for typing in Lushootseed
 Interactive alphabet app through the Tulalip Lushootseed Department
 “History professor helps keep local Native American language alive” by Drew Brown for PLU Scene Magazine
 The Lushootseed Peoples of Puget Sound Country
 Lushootseed Research
 Dr. David Beck, Salishan Language specialist
 Developing a corpus for Lushootseed (archived)

Coast Salish languages

Indigenous languages of the Pacific Northwest Coast
Indigenous languages of Washington (state)
Native American language revitalization
Endangered indigenous languages of the Americas
Tulalip Tribes